Samuel Ariaretnam Sabapathy (8 September 1898 – 12 February 1964 ) was a Ceylon Tamil lawyer and the first Mayor of Jaffna.

Early life and family
Sabapathy was born on 8 September 1898. He was the son of Kanagasabapathipillai from Varany and Annammah. His brother S. Kulendran was Bishop of Jaffna. Sabapathy was educated at St. John's College, Jaffna where he was head prefect, captain of the cricket team and member of the football team.

Sabapathy married Kanakeswary, daughter of Nagalingam from Tholpuram. They had a daughter (Padmini).

Career
Sabapathy joined the legal profession after finishing his education, becoming a proctor specialising in criminal law. He practised law in Jaffna.

Sabapathy was elected to Jaffna Urban Council, serving as its chairman between 1937 and 1939. Jaffna was given municipality status in 1949 and Sabapathy became the city's first mayor. He is credited with creation of Jaffna Public Library, Subramaniam Park and Health Centre/Maternity Clinic. Sabapathy laid the foundation stone for the library on 29 March 1953.

Death
Sabapathy died on 12 February 1964.

References

1898 births
1964 deaths
Alumni of St. John's College, Jaffna
Ceylonese proctors
Mayors of Jaffna
Sri Lankan Tamil lawyers
Sri Lankan Tamil politicians